The white-crested elaenia (Elaenia albiceps) is a species of bird in the family Tyrannidae, the tyrant flycatchers. It has several subspecies breeding across southern and western parts of South America. Southern birds migrate north in winter.

Its natural habitats are temperate forests, subtropical or tropical moist montane forests, subtropical or tropical high-altitude shrubland, and heavily degraded former forest.

Description
The white-crested elaenia easily is recognizable as an elaenia by the combination of drab plumage (primarily dull green above, and whitish below); wings with conspicuous wing bars (pale tips to the greater and median wing coverts); slightly crested appearance, with a semi-concealed white center to the crown; and upright posture. small-billed elaenia, lesser elaenia and sierran elaenia cannot always be distinguished in the field.

Subspecies 
At least five subspecies are recognized:
 Elaenia albiceps griseigularis - Sclater, PL, 1859: found from southwestern Colombia to northwestern Peru
 Elaenia albiceps diversa - Zimmer, JT, 1941: found in north-central Peru
 Elaenia albiceps urubambae - Zimmer, JT, 1941: found in southeastern Peru
 Elaenia albiceps albiceps - (D'Orbigny & Lafresnaye, 1837): found in extreme southeastern Peru and northwestern Bolivia
 Elaenia albiceps modesta - Tschudi, 1844: found in western Peru and northwestern Chile. This subspecies has distinctly different vocals and may potentially be re-classified as a separate species, the Peruvian elaenia.
 A sixth subspecies,  E. a. chilensis - Hellmayr, 1927, found in Bolivia, Argentina and Chile is further recognized by some authorities as a separate species, the Chilean elaenia.

Distribution and habitat
The white-crested elaenia is a permanent resident in the central and southwestern coastal Andean region of South America in Peru, Ecuador, Bolivia, and northernmost Chile. Also, in most of Argentina, mostly western, and southern and central Chile, Tierra del Fuego, it is also resident.

To the north and east in northeast Brazil, the Amazon Basin, and in the Amazonian Andes regions of eastern Colombia, Peru, and northern Bolivia southeastwards into eastern Brazil, white-crested elaenia is a non-breeding resident bird, in the austral winter. In the entirety of South America, two thirds of its range is as a non-breeding migratory species. It is a vagrant to the Falkland Islands and in 2008 a bird was found in Texas, a potential first for the United States and North America. A second bird was reported in Chicago in 2012.

Like many other species of Elaenia, white-crested elaenia is found in a variety of wooded habitats. Throughout most of its breeding distribution in the Andes, white-crested elaenia is found at forest edge, in second growth, and in scrub. In at least some areas, it breeds in drier intermontane valleys, rather than the more humid forests occupied by Sierran elaenia, but the habitat relationships between the two species have not been studied in detail.

Behavior and ecology
It regularly consumes small fruit, at least when not breeding, but takes small insects as well. It also eats a large variety of foods such as grass, berries, seeds, and nuts. The white-crested elaenia typically is solitary, but, at least when not breeding, may congregate with other frugivores at fruiting trees. Aggregations of up to 100 individuals have been reported during migration.

The oldest known white-crested elaenia from banding studies was eight years and two months old, though it is uncertain whether this represents the maximum potential longevity of the species.

References

External links
 White-crested Elaenia videos on the Internet Bird Collection
 White-crested Elaenia photo gallery VIREO
 Photo-Medium Res; Article & Synopsis avesdechile

white-crested elaenia
Birds of the Andes
Birds of Ecuador
Birds of Peru
Birds of Chile
Birds of Tierra del Fuego
white-crested elaenia
Taxonomy articles created by Polbot
Taxa named by Frédéric de Lafresnaye
Taxa named by Alcide d'Orbigny